St. George's Protestant Episcopal Church may refer to:

 St. George's Protestant Episcopal Church (Brooklyn), New York City
 St. George's Episcopal Church (Valley Lee, Maryland)

See also
St. George's Episcopal Church (disambiguation)
St George's Church (disambiguation)